Regis or Régis may refer to:

People 
 Regis (given name), a given name (including a list of people with the name)
 Regis (surname), a surname (including a list of people with the name)
 Regis (musician), full name Karl O'Connor, an English electronic music and techno DJ
 Régis (footballer, born 1965), full name Reginaldo Paes Leme Ferreira, Brazilian football goalkeeper
 Régis (footballer, born 1976), full name Régis Amarante Lima de Quadros, Brazilian football manager and former centre-back
 Régis (footballer, born June 1989), full name Régis Ribeiro de Souza, Brazilian football right-back
 Régis (footballer, born November 1989), full name Régis dos Santos Silva, Brazilian football defensive midfielder
 Régis (footballer, born 1992), full name Régis Augusto Salmazzo, Brazilian football attacking midfielder
 Régis (footballer, born 1998), full name Régis Tosatti Giacomin, Brazilian football forward

Education 
 Regis College (Massachusetts) (town of Weston), United States
 Regis College, Toronto, Ontario, Canada
 Regis School (disambiguation), several schools
 Regis High School (disambiguation), several schools
 Regis University, Denver, Colorado, United States

Places 
 Regis (place), an English toponym for places with a Royal connection
 Regis, Denver, a neighborhood in Denver, Colorado, United States

Other uses 
 ReGIS, a Remote Graphic Instruction Set used on video terminals produced by Digital Equipment Corporation
 Regis Corporation, a hair salon chain
 The REGIS Mark V, a villain on the cartoon show Megas XLR
 Regis, a character in R. A. Salvatore's Forgotten Realms novels and one of the Companions of the Hall
 , a United States Navy patrol boat in commission from 1917 to 1919

See also 
 Saint Regis (disambiguation)
 Regi (disambiguation)
 Regia (disambiguation)
 Regius (disambiguation)
 IWG, a serviced office accommodation company that previously traded as Regus